HMS Raglan  was a First World War Royal Navy  monitor, which was sunk during the Battle of Imbros in January 1918.

Design
On 3 November 1914, Charles M. Schwab of Bethlehem Steel offered Winston Churchill, then First Lord of the Admiralty, the use of eight /45 cal BL MK II guns in twin gun turrets, originally destined for the Greek battleship . These turrets could not be delivered to the German builders, due to the British blockade. The Royal Navy immediately designed a class of monitors, designed for shore bombardment, to use the turrets.

Construction
Raglan was laid down at the Harland and Wolff Ltd shipyard at Govan on 1 December 1914. The ship was named Robert E Lee in honour of the CSA General Robert E Lee, however as the United States was still neutral, the ship was hurriedly renamed HMS M3 on 31 May 1915. She was then named HMS Lord Raglan on 20 June 1915 and again renamed HMS Raglan on 23 June 1915.

Career

Raglan sailed for the Dardanelles in June 1915. She remained in the Eastern Mediterranean, based at Imbros. On 29 October, Raglan took part in the Third Battle of Gaza.

Raglan was sunk with the loss of 127 lives. The monitor  was also sunk in the same battle. Midilli and Yavuz Sultan Selim ran into a minefield while withdrawing; Midilli sank and Yavuz Sultan Selim was badly damaged.

References

Bibliography

 
Dittmar, F. J. & Colledge, J. J., "British Warships 1914-1919", (Ian Allan, London, 1972), 
Gray, Randal (ed), "Conway's All the World's Fighting Ships 1906-1921", (Conway Maritime Press, London, 1985), 

 

Abercrombie-class monitors
Ships built in Govan
1915 ships
World War I monitors of the United Kingdom
World War I shipwrecks in the Aegean Sea
Maritime incidents in 1918
Ships built by Harland and Wolff
Shipwrecks of Turkey